Thomas Willoughby  (1593–?) was a North American colonist.

Thomas Willoughby  may also refer to:

Thomas Willoughby (MP for Downton) (died before 1596), MP for Downton (UK Parliament constituency)
Thomas Willoughby (MP for Lincolnshire) (died 1418), MP for Lincolnshire (UK Parliament constituency)
Thomas Willoughby (MP) (1694–1742), English politician
Thomas Willoughby, 1st Baron Middleton (1672–1729), English politician
Thomas Willoughby, 4th Baron Middleton (1728–1781), English nobleman
Thomas Willoughby, 11th Baron Willoughby of Parham (1602–1691/92), English peer
Thomas Willoughby (Virginia), settler in 1610
Tom Willoughby (1889–1964), Australian rules footballer

See also